Lights, Camera, Africa! is a film festival which has been held annually in Lagos since 2011.

The festival was established by Ugoma Adegoke. Hosted by The Life House, the inaugural Lights, Camera, Africa! was supported by New York's African Film Festival, Inc. and ran for three days, from 30 September – 2 October 2011.

Annual editions

References

External links
 Lights Camera Africa!!! website

Film festivals in Lagos
Film festivals established in 2011
Annual events in Lagos